Bearded bulbul may refer to:

 Eastern bearded greenbul, a species of bird found in central Africa 
 Western bearded greenbul, a species of bird found in western Africa 

Birds by common name